The following is a list of episodes from World Channel series America ReFramed, a production of American Documentary, Inc.. Since 2012, America ReFramed has broadcast over 120 films by independent filmmakers.

Season 1

Season 2

Season 3

Season 4

Season 5

Season 6

Season 7

Season 9

Season 11

References 

America Reframed